Rolf Heinzmann is a Swiss para-alpine skier. He represented Switzerland at the Winter Paralympics in 1980, 1984, 1994, 1998 and 2002.

Career 

Heinzmann represented Switzerland in five editions of the Winter Paralympics and, in total, he won twelve gold medals and two silver medals.

In 1984, he competed in the disabled skiing event which was held as demonstration sport at the 1984 Winter Olympics.

Achievements

See also 
 List of Paralympic medalists in alpine skiing

References 

Living people
Year of birth missing (living people)
Place of birth missing (living people)
Paralympic alpine skiers of Switzerland
Alpine skiers at the 1980 Winter Paralympics
Alpine skiers at the 1984 Winter Paralympics
Alpine skiers at the 1994 Winter Paralympics
Alpine skiers at the 1998 Winter Paralympics
Alpine skiers at the 2002 Winter Paralympics
Medalists at the 1980 Winter Paralympics
Medalists at the 1984 Winter Paralympics
Medalists at the 1994 Winter Paralympics
Medalists at the 1998 Winter Paralympics
Medalists at the 2002 Winter Paralympics
Paralympic gold medalists for Switzerland
Paralympic silver medalists for Switzerland
Paralympic medalists in alpine skiing
Swiss amputees